In mathematics, the Hall–Littlewood polynomials are symmetric functions depending on a parameter t and a partition λ.  They are Schur functions when t is 0 and monomial symmetric functions when t is 1 and are special cases of Macdonald polynomials.
They were first defined indirectly by  Philip Hall using the Hall algebra, and later defined directly by Dudley E. Littlewood (1961).

Definition
The Hall–Littlewood polynomial P is defined by

where λ is a partition of at most n with elements λi, and m(i) elements equal to i,  and Sn is the symmetric group of order n!.

As an example,

Specializations

We have that ,   and 
 where the latter is the Schur P polynomials.

Properties

Expanding the Schur polynomials in terms of the Hall–Littlewood polynomials, one has

where  are the Kostka–Foulkes polynomials.

A combinatorial description for the Kostka–Foulkes polynomials was given by Lascoux and Schützenberger,

where "charge" is a certain combinatorial statistic on semistandard Young tableaux,
and the sum is taken over all semi-standard Young tableaux with shape λ and type μ.

See also
 Hall polynomial

References

External links

Orthogonal polynomials
Algebraic combinatorics
Symmetric functions